Ruine Liechtenstein is a castle in Styria, Austria. Ruine Liechtenstein is situated at an elevation of 852 m.

See also
List of castles in Austria

References

This article was initially translated from the German Wikipedia.

Castles in Styria
House of Liechtenstein